Stefan Ihrig is an academic, author, and speaker. He is professor of history at the University of Haifa and director of the Haifa Center for German and European Studies.  His research interests are European and Middle Eastern history, with a focus on media and political and social discourse. His 2014 and 2016 books dealing with German-Turkish history and entanglement have elicited critical praise. He is also an editor of the Journal of Holocaust Research published by the University of Haifa and has contributed articles for HuffPost, Tablet, Haaretz, and History Today, among other publications.

Early life and education
Ihrig is the son of Johann and Beate Ihrig. He earned his bachelor's degree in law and politics at Queen Mary University, London. He received his master's degree in history, Turcology, and political science from the Free University of Berlin. He completed his PhD in history at the University of Cambridge.
His doctoral thesis on German-Turkish relations in the 20th century was supervised by Sir Richard J. Evans.

Academic career
Before joining the University of Haifa, Ihrig was a Polonsky Fellow at the Van Leer Jerusalem Institute, a lecturer at the University of Regensburg and the Free University of Berlin, and a researcher at the Georg Eckert Institute in Braunschweig.

Research and publications
Ihrig's first individually-authored book, published in 2008, was Wer sind die Moldawier? Rumänismus versus Moldowanismus in Historiographie und Geschichtsschulbüchern der Republik Moldova  ("Who are the Moldovans? Romanianism versus Moldovanism in Historiography and History Textbooks of the Republic of Moldova"). Reviewer Matthew H. Ciscel states that the book is "broadly detailed and well-written" and Dietmar Müller describes it as "an impressive study on historiography and history politics in the Republic of Moldova based on a wide range of sources".

Ihrig's recent research has focused on the reception of the Ottoman Empire and Turkey in Germany, and he has published two books on the subject: Atatürk in the Nazi Imagination (2014) and  Justifying Genocide: Germany and the Armenians from Bismarck to Hitler (2016), both published by Harvard University Press. According to Ihrig, there was a Nazi "fandom" of Atatürk, the founder of the Republic of Turkey, and the Nazis admired the "postgenocidal paradise" of Atatürk's New Turkey and sought to emulate it. Ihrig states that the Armenian genocide has been held hostage by the politics of Armenian genocide denial and Armenian genocide recognition, which has prevented the event from being integrated into twentieth-century world history. Ihrig states that the Armenian genocide was the "double original sin" of the twentieth century, explaining:

Other activities
Ihrig is one of the editors of the Journal of Holocaust Research published by the University of Haifa. He has also contributed articles for HuffPost, Tablet magazine, Haaretz, and History Today, among other publications.

Awards and honors
Ihrig's 2014 book Atatürk in the Nazi Imagination earned an official commendation in the 2013 Fraenkel Prize Competition sponsored by the Wiener Library for the Study of the Holocaust and Genocide in London. His 2016 work Justifying Genocide: Germany and the Armenians from Bismarck to Hitler won the 2017 Sonia Aronian Book Prize for Excellence in Armenian Studies from the National Association for Armenian Studies and Research.

Personal life
Ihrig's wife, Roni Malkai Ihrig, is an attorney and CEO of the Israeli Public Forum for Youth Villages and Boarding Schools for Children at Risk.

Bibliography

Books
 Carnevale, R.; Ihrig, S.; Weiss, C. (2005). Europa am Bosporus (er-)finden? Die Diskussion um den Beitritt der Türkei zur Europäischen Union in den britischen, deutschen, französischen und italienischen Zeitungen – Eine Presseanalyse. Peter Lang.
 Ihrig, Stefan (2008). Wer sind die Moldawier? Rumänismus versus Moldowanismus in Historiographie und Geschichtsschulbüchern der Republik Moldova, 1991-2006. Ibidem Press.

Selected articles and book chapters

References

External links 

"The Armenian Genocide and the 20th Century" Zoom lecture on August 30, 2020

Historians of Germany
Academic staff of the University of Haifa
Year of birth missing (living people)
Living people
Historians of the Armenian genocide